Elizabeth C. Hoffman (January 26, 1942 – August 16, 2007) was an American politician from New York.

Life
She was born Elizabeth Booth on January 26, 1942, in Buffalo, New York. She attended Mount St. Mary Academy and George Washington University. She engaged in the real estate business in North Tonawanda, Niagara County, New York.

She entered politics as a Republican, and was a member of the North Tonawanda Common Council from 1978 to 1979; and Mayor of North Tonawanda from 1980 to 1992.

She was a member of the New York State Assembly from 1993 to 1995, sitting in the 190th and 191st New York State Legislatures. She decided to run for the State Senate seat vacated by John B. Daly, and resigned her Assembly seat in February 1995. She ran on the Conservative and Right to Life tickets but, on March 14, was defeated by the Republican nominee George D. Maziarz.

She died on August 17, 2007, at her home in Tonawanda, Erie County, New York.

References

1942 births
2007 deaths
People from North Tonawanda, New York
Women state legislators in New York (state)
Republican Party members of the New York State Assembly
George Washington University alumni
New York (state) city council members
Mayors of places in New York (state)
20th-century American politicians
Women city councillors in New York (state)
20th-century American women politicians
Women mayors of places in New York (state)